Zu or ZU may refer to:

Arts and entertainment

Fictional elements
 Zu, a mountain featured in the films Zu Warriors from the Magic Mountain and The Legend of Zu
 Zu, a large birdlike monster from the Final Fantasy series

Other uses in arts and entertainment
 Zu (band), an Italian hardcore/jazz band
 zu and zun, types of ancient Chinese ritual bronzes

Language
 There are two different kana (Japanese script) letters that are romanized as zu:
 ず: Su (す) with dakuten (voicing marks)
 づ: Tsu (つ) with dakuten; in modern standard Japanese primarily used for indicating a voiced consonant in the middle of a compound word, and can never begin a word
 Zu (cuneiform), a sign in cuneiform writing
 Zulu language, ISO 639-2 code:zu

Names
 Zu (surname) (祖), a Chinese surname
 Zu, a nobiliary particle, in German
 Ziv Kalontarov (born 1997), Israeli swimmer

Places
 Zu, North Khorasan, a village in North Khorasan Province, Iran
 Zu, Razavi Khorasan, a village in Razavi Khorasan Province, Iran

Science and technology
 Scott–Potter set theory, called ZU because it is equivalent to Zermelo set theory with urelements
 Zu (fish), a genus of ribbonfish

Other uses
 Ziauddin University
 Zeppelin University
 Zu (mythology), a lesser god in Akkadian mythology
 Helios Airways (IATA code ZU)

See also
Zou (disambiguation)